Wudai Huiyao (五代會要, "Institutions of the Five Dynasties Period") is a Chinese historiography book on the Five Dynasties period (roughly 907–960) of ancient China, written by the Song Dynasty chancellor Wang Pu (922–982), who had personally served the last 2 of the 5 dynasties, namely the Later Han and the Later Zhou.

After collecting as much information on government systems in the chaotic period as he could find, he carefully examined the material before compiling it into Wudai Huiyao. The work was presented, along with Wang's Tang Huiyao, the Tang Dynasty counterpart, to Emperor Taizu of Song. It was published in 30 chapters.

References
 
 

Chinese history texts
10th-century history books
Five Dynasties and Ten Kingdoms
Song dynasty literature
10th-century Chinese books